Abacetus desaegeri is a species of ground beetle in the subfamily Pterostichinae. It was described by Straneo in 1963.

References

desaegeri
Beetles described in 1963